Action Directe is a short  sport climb at the limestone Waldkopf crag in Frankenjura, Germany.  When it was first climbed by German climber Wolfgang Güllich in 1991, it became the first climb in the world to have a consensus  grade. It is considered an important and historic route in rock climbing history, and one of the most attempted climbs at its grade, where it is considered the "benchmark" for 9a.  The training techniques Güllich used to prepare for the unique physical demands of Action Directe also revolutionized climbing and what could be achieved.

History 

A close friend of Güllich, German climber Milan Sykora introduced him to the route that he had been working on at a large limestone prow at the Waldkopf crag, which was akin to an enormous boulder. Sykora was one of the leading German climbers at the time and had created several new routes UIAA grade X. In the 1980s, Sykora had bolted a line coming from the right and had managed to climb the individual moves through the upper section, but believed the lower section feasible but too hard for himself – he generously offered the project to Güllich, who promptly bolted the direct start, and hence the name "Directe"; Güllich said that it also named after the French terror group Action directe as climbing it felt like an attack on the fingers.

Güllich completed the first free ascent on 14 September 1991, after 11 days of working the route – spread over a three-week period – and using a 16-move sequence including a direct start with a dynamic jump into a two-finger pocket to redpoint it. Güllich was 30 at the time and had been married just 5 days previously to freeing the route.  It took another four years until the route was repeated when East German climber Alexander Adler fulfilled what he described as an "obsession" to repeat the climb.  Subsequent climbers have used a slightly different circa 11 to 13-move sequence to Güllich's original very direct 16-move sequence.  At the 25-year anniversary of its first ascent, ten climbers who had completed the route assembled and estimated only Adler had repeated Güllich's exact 16-move sequence, and that all others had crossed slightly right to use a  shorter sequence.

It wasn't for almost another decade, until 2001 when Chris Sharma freed the 35-metre Realization/Biographie at Céüse in France, that a higher consensus  grade would be assigned.

In May 2020, French climber Mélissa Le Nevé became the first female to ascend the route, and almost three decades after Güllich's original ascent was still only the 27th person to have climbed it.  Two of the 27 ascents, Richard Simpson (2005), and Said Belhaj (2018), are disputed.

Route

Action Directe is famous for its unique style, involving physically demanding dynamic moves (known as dynos in bouldering) off single-finger pockets in the limestone, and in particular, a powerful initial dynamic jump-start into a two-finger pocket while leaning back at an extreme angle of 45-degrees.

After his 2016 ascent, German climber David Firnenburg described it as: "The initial dyno into the sharp two-finger pocket is followed by a passage with extreme lock-offs on small finger pockets. Then there are technically complicated side holds and pinches with difficult foot changes before you run out with a tricky must-hit crimp at the very end, where I still fell several times before sending".

Legacy

Action Directe has been consistently described as famous, legendary, and iconic in the climbing media, and even in 2020, it was being described as "an absolute cornerstone of cutting-edge difficulties that attracts an irresistible draw for the vertical elite", and "... milestone 9a is one of the most famous and coveted sport climbs in the world".  Action Directe has also been described as "Güllich's masterpiece", and when he freed the route, he was at the height of his physical and technical powers. 

Güllich had used new intensive training techniques called plyometrics to prepare for the physical demands of the climb, and introduced the climbing world to the "campus board", which would become the new standard for future extreme climbers to build finger strength and develop more dynamic muscle strength.

Some have speculated whether English climber Ben Moon's 1990 ascent of the very short Hubble, with only 4 crux moves, was actually the world's first  route.  Repeat ascents of Hubble have verified it as being at least the world's first .  German climber Alex Megos, is one of the few who have climbed both Hubble and Action Directe, and felt Hubble was probably an 8c+ in the right conditions, although Megos caveated himself by noting that grading is not an exact science, and is subject to the climber's own style. In 2022, British climber Buster Martin became only the second climber to have climbed both routes and felt that they were both 9a; he did note that being sponsored by Ben Moon might make people skeptical of his view.

The situation has been compared to the Realization versus Alexander Huber's  debate on the world's first .  In fact, Huber attributes the initial conservative  grading of Action Directe that persisted for many years, despite it being eventually shown to be a "hard 9a", for artificially suppressing the grades of other routes in the 1990s, such as Huber's La Rambla, and Weisse Rose.

Ascents 
Action Directe has been ascended by:

 1st Wolfgang Güllich, 14 September 1991
 2nd Alexander Adler, 9 September 1995
 3rd , 7 June 2000
 4th Dave Graham, 21 May 2001
 5th , 14 May 2003
 6th  Richard Simpson, 2005 (disputed)
 7th Dai Koyamada, 15 October 2005
 8th , 22 October 2005
 9th Kilian Fischhuber, September 2006
 10th Adam Ondra, 19 May 2008
 11th Patxi Usobiaga, 24 October 2008
 12th , 17 April 2010
 13th Jan Hojer, 22 May 2010
 14th , 10 October 2010
 15th Felix Knaub, October 2011
 16th , 26 March 2012
 17th Alexander Megos, 3 May 2014
 18th Felix Neumärker, 16 May 2015
 19th Julius Westphal, 25 June 2015
 20th , 14 June 2016
 21st , November 2016
 22nd Stephan Vogt, 2017.
 23rd , 2017
 24th Said Belhaj, 2018 (disputed)
 25th , 2 November 2018.
 26th Adrian Chmiała, 5 May 2019
 27th Mélissa Le Nevé, May 2020; first female
 28th Phillip Gaßner, May 2021
 29th Buster Martin, October 2022

Filmography
 Dai Koyamada's 2005 ascent: 
 Jan Hojer's 2014 (second) ascent: 
 Stephan Vogt's 2017 ascent: 
 Mélissa Le Nevé's 2020 ascent:

See also
History of rock climbing
List of first ascents (sport climbing)
Silence, first climb in the world with a potential grade of 
La Dura Dura, second climb in the world with a consensus grade of 
Jumbo Love, first climb in the world with a potential grade of 
Realization/Biographie, first climb in the world with a consensus grade of 
Hubble, first climb in the world with a consensus grade of

Notes

References

External links 
 Adam Ondra, 15, Repeats Action Directe (video), Climbing (May 2008)

Climbing routes
1991 in sport climbing
Sport climbing